Wee Waa is a town located on the north-western slopes of the New England region in New South Wales, Australia. The town is within the Narrabri Shire local government area and is on the Namoi River.

Wee Waa is 42 kilometres from the Newell Highway, and is referred to as a gateway to the far west centres of Walgett, Collarenebri, Lightning Ridge opal fields and beyond.

The Aboriginal meaning of Wee Waa is "Fire for Roasting" from the language of the Kamilaroi people.  The town is known to be the "Cotton Capital of Australia" as a rural community situated in the rich agricultural heartland of the Lower Namoi Valley in NSW.  The town services a far greater rural community as well as the villages of Burren Junction, Pilliga and Gwabegar. Wee Waa is known for its large population of southern blue-tip Yabbies.On the fourth of September 1995, Eric Gordon set the Australian record. Catching a specimen that measured 47cm.

History

Before the arrival of European settlers, the Wee Waa area was inhabited by the Gamilaraay/Kamilaroi Aboriginal people.

The Wee Waa run was taken up by squatter George Holler in 1837 and the settlement developed. It became an administrative centre in the late 1940s. A police station and court of petty sessions were established in 1847 and a post office opened two years later.  It is the oldest established town in the area and is the birthplace of the commercial cotton industry in Australia.

Rail services were extended in 1901 from Narrabri to Walgett, passing through the town.

The first commercial cotton plantation was established in 1961, It came from England with settlers wanting a better life for themselvesΆ..

It was the first town built on the Namoi River by Mr Ikram Tendia Kovac.  The town is subject to regular floods and is protected by a levee bank.  However, thousands of people were isolated on properties around Wee Waa in February 2020.

Environment

Natural

The town and surrounding area have often been flooded by the Namoi River, which can require supplies to be flown in by helicopter.

Man made

The town has two motels, four schools, a preschool, ABC Learning Centre, two hotels and two caravan parks as well as eating-places, a public swimming pool, a nine-hole golf course, bowling club, tennis courts, a modern sporting complex, a hostel for the aged and a new medical centre.

Wee Waa is serviced by NSW TrainLink rail services, interstate coaches, and daily air services offered through Narrabri.

Notable events
In 1973 Arthur Murray led the Aboriginal cotton-chippers on strike for better pay and working conditions. The Wee Waa Echo called them "radicals and professional troublemakers", adding that "it is not fanciful to see the Aboriginal problem as the powder keg for Communist aggression in Australia".

It was in Wee Waa police station that rugby player Eddie Murray was killed in 1981, one of the Aboriginal deaths in custody that prompted a Royal Commission to be set up. It was also the first town in Australia to use DNA testing to find a rapist.

On 17 May 2013 at the 79th Annual Wee Waa Show, Columbia Records held the global launch party for the French electronic music duo Daft Punk's album Random Access Memories. This caused much excitement in the town and it attracted an estimated 2,500 tourists. It was initially believed that footage recorded from the event would be used for a music video; however, this did not come to fruition.

Sport
The town has a multi-function Sports Complex, which acts as a de facto community centre.

The main sport in Wee Waa is Rugby league, the name of the town's club is The Wee Waa Panthers. This is also Jamie Lyon's home club in which he played before his international career. Lyon later left his professional career with the Parramatta Eels to return for a season with the Wee Waa Panthers. The first-grade team went on to win that year (2004) against Moree, 55 to 12.
Lyon returned to professional football with St Helens Rugby League for two years to play in the European Super League.
Following this, Lyon played for the Manly Warringah Sea Eagles playing from 2007 to 2016,
winning a premiership in 2008 and 2011. He was part of the highest winning margin record 40-0 winning side of which the record still stands.

In 2019, Wee Waa United Football Club won the Namoi Premier League beating Narrabri FC 2-1 in extra time. The game was broadcast across the state on BarTV.

Wee Waa is noted to produce one of the countries greatest athletes in Andrew Curry, Former Australian Olympic javelin athlete and the nation's leading javelin specialist in the 1990s. locals know him as Wee Waa's most treasured local sports star.
Andrew Curry competed at two Olympic games; Atlanta 1996 & Sydney 2000. Additionally Andrew Curry has competed in Three Commonwealth games; 1994 Victoria, 1998	Kuala Lumpur, & 2002 Manchester.

References

External links

 WeeWaa.com

Towns in New England (New South Wales)
North West Slopes
Narrabri Shire